Quercus jenseniana is an Asian species of trees in the beech family Fagaceae. It is native to southern China, found in the Provinces of Fujian, Guangdong, Guangxi, Guizhou, Hubei, Hunan, Jiangxi, Yunnan,  and Zhejiang. It is placed in subgenus Cerris, section Cyclobalanopsis.

Quercus jenseniana is a large tree up to 35 meters tall. Leaves can be as much as 30 cm long.

References

External links
Flora of China Illustrations vol. 4, fig. 374, drawings 1-5

jenseniana
Flora of China
Plants described in 1877